Richfield Township is may refer to the following places in the U.S. state of Michigan:

 Richfield Township, Genesee County, Michigan
 Richfield Township, Roscommon County, Michigan

See also 
 Richfield Township (disambiguation)
 Richland Township, Michigan (disambiguation)
 Richmond Township, Michigan (disambiguation)

Michigan township disambiguation pages